Ballyshannon  was a constituency represented in the Irish House of Commons from 1613 to 1800.

Borough
This constituency was the parliamentary borough of Ballyshannon in County Donegal. It returned two members to the Parliament of Ireland from 1613 to 1800.

Members of Parliament, 1613–1801

Notes

References

Bibliography
Return of Members of Parliament (1878), vol. ii, p. 611–612.

Ballyshannon
Constituencies of the Parliament of Ireland (pre-1801)
Historic constituencies in County Donegal
1613 establishments in Ireland
1800 disestablishments in Ireland
Constituencies established in 1613
Constituencies disestablished in 1800